Deraeocoris flavilinea is a species of plant bug in the family Miridae.

Description
D. flavilinea measures 7–8 mm in length. They are sexually dimorphic: males are much darker than the more orange females, and the front and rear margins of the pronotum are narrowly pale. The cuneus is variable and the sides of the scutellum paler in both sexes.

Distribution
D. flavilinea is present in Austria, Belgium, United Kingdom, Czech Republic, France, Germany, Italy, Luxembourg, Malta, and Slovenia. 
It was first recorded in the UK in 1996.

References

Deraeocorini
Insects described in 1862